Stadium (Italian: Stadio) is a 1934 Italian sports film directed by Carlo Campogalliani and starring Emma Guerra, Maria Arcione, and Giorgio Censi.

It was shot at the Cines Studios in Rome. The film's sets were designed by Gastone Medin.

Cast
 Emma Guerra as Renata  
 Maria Arcione as Phily  
 Giorgio Censi as Gianni  
 Enrico Amante as Ugo  
 Enzo Rampelli as Fulvio  
 Giancarlo Del Vecchio as Gino  
 Luigi Beccali as Se stesso 
 Gianfranco Bondi
 Andrea Checchi 
 Enzo Pietropaoli 
 Piero Vinci

References

Bibliography
 Mancini, Elaine. Struggles of the Italian film industry during fascism, 1930-1935. UMI Research Press, 1985.

External links

1934 films
1930s sports films
Italian sports films
1930s Italian-language films
Films directed by Carlo Campogalliani
Italian black-and-white films
Cines Studios films
1930s Italian films